Hawaiiana is a popular term of academia used in reference to history and various aspects of the culture of Hawai'i, currently a region and state of the United States. The term is used especially in reflection of the periods of antiquity and the Kingdom of Hawai'i era. Hawaiiana has become increasingly popular among students of history and sociology throughout the world. The principal repository of Hawaiiana is the Princess Bernice Pauahi Bishop Museum in Honolulu on the island of O'ahu. The institution is also called the Hawai'i State Museum of Natural and Cultural History and often shares artifacts and information with other institutions globally for the sake of research and study.

The term "Hawaiiana" has been in use since 1915, perhaps even earlier, despite the widespread belief Hawaiian entertainer and cultural expert, Nona Beamer, coined the term in 1948.

See also

Americana

References 

 
Hawaii culture
1910s neologisms